Ali Beygluy, also rendered as Ali Beyglu or Alibeyglu, may refer to:
 Ali Beygluy-e Olya
 Ali Beygluy-e Sofla